Benjamin Franklin Norris Jr. (March 5, 1870 – October 25, 1902) was an American journalist and novelist during the Progressive Era, whose fiction was predominantly in the naturalist genre. His notable works include McTeague: A Story of San Francisco (1899), The Octopus: A Story of California (1901) and The Pit (1903).

Life
Norris was born in Chicago, Illinois, in 1870. His father, Benjamin, was a self-made Chicago businessman and his mother, Gertrude Glorvina Doggett, had a stage career. In 1884 the family moved to San Francisco where Benjamin went into real estate. In 1887, after the death of his brother and a brief stay in London, young Norris went to Académie Julian in Paris where he studied painting for two years and was exposed to the naturalist novels of Émile Zola. Between 1890 and 1894 he attended the University of California, Berkeley, where he became acquainted with the ideas of human evolution of Darwin and Spencer that are reflected in his later writings. His stories appeared in the undergraduate magazine at Berkeley and in the San Francisco Wave.  After his parents' divorce he went east and spent a year in the English Department of Harvard University. There he met Lewis E. Gates, who encouraged his writing. He worked as a news correspondent in South Africa (1895–96) for the San Francisco Chronicle, and then as editorial assistant for the San Francisco Wave (1896–97). He worked for McClure's Magazine as a war correspondent in Cuba during the Spanish–American War in 1898. He joined the New York City publishing firm of Doubleday & Page in 1899.

During his time at the University of California, Berkeley, Norris was a brother in the Fraternity of Phi Gamma Delta and was an originator of the Skull & Keys society. Because of his involvement with a prank during the Class Day Exercises in 1893, the annual alumni dinner held by each Phi Gamma Delta chapter still bears his name. In 1900 Frank Norris married Jeannette Black. They had a child in 1902.  

Norris died in San Francisco on October 25, 1902, of peritonitis from a ruptured appendix.   This left The Epic of the Wheat trilogy unfinished. He was only 32. He is buried in Mountain View Cemetery in Oakland, California.

Charles Gilman Norris, the author's younger brother, became a well regarded novelist and editor. C. G. Norris was also the husband of the prolific novelist Kathleen Norris.  The Bancroft Library of the University of California, Berkeley, houses the archives of all three writers.

Career
Frank Norris's work often includes depictions of suffering caused by corrupt and greedy turn-of-the-century corporate monopolies. In The Octopus: A California Story, the Pacific and Southwest Railroad is implicated in the suffering and deaths of a number of ranchers in Southern California.  At the end of the novel, after a bloody shootout between farmers and railroad agents at one of the ranches (named Los Muertos), readers are encouraged to take a "larger view" that sees that "through the welter of blood at the irrigating ditch ... the great harvest of Los Muertos rolled like a flood from the Sierras to the Himalayas to feed thousands of starving scarecrows on the barren plains of India".  Though free-wheeling market capitalism causes the deaths of many of the characters in the novel, this "larger view always ... discovers the Truth that will, in the end, prevail, and all things, surely, inevitably, resistlessly work together for good".

The novel Vandover and the Brute, written in the 1890s, but not published until after his death, is about three college friends preparing to become successful, and the ruin of one due to a degenerate lifestyle.

In addition to Zola's, Norris's writing has been compared to that of Stephen Crane, Theodore Dreiser, and Edith Wharton.

Critical reception
Although some of his novels remain highly admired, aspects of Norris's work have not fared well with literary critics in the late 20th and early 21st century. As Donald Pizer writes "Frank Norris's racism, which included the most vicious anti-Semitic portrayals in any major work of American literature, has long been an embarrassment to admirers of the vigor and intensity of his best fiction and has also contributed to the decline of his reputation during the past several generations." Other scholars have confirmed Norris's antisemitism. Norris's work is often seen as strongly influenced by the scientific racism of the late 19th century, such as that espoused by his professor at the University of California, Berkeley, Joseph LeConte. Along with his contemporary Jack London, Norris is seen as "reconstructing American identity as a biological category of Anglo-Saxon masculinity." In Norris's work, critics have seen evidence of racism, antisemitism, and contempt for immigrants and the working poor, all of whom are seen as the losers in a Social-Darwinist struggle for existence.

Legacy

 Norris's novel The Pit was adapted for the theater by Channing Pollock in four acts. Produced by William A. Brady, the play premiered at New York's Lyric Theatre on February 10, 1904. A film adaptation of The Pit was produced in 1917, by William A. Brady's Picture Plays Inc.
 Norris's short story "A Deal in Wheat" (1903) and the novel The Pit were the basis for the 1909 D.W. Griffith film A Corner in Wheat. 
 Norris's Moran of the Lady Letty was adapted by Monte M. Katterjohn in 1922. Directed by George Melford, the film starred Rudolph Valentino and Dorothy Dalton.
 Norris's McTeague has been filmed twice. The best known version is the 1924 film entitled Greed directed by Erich von Stroheim. An earlier adaptation, Life's Whirlpool, was produced in 1915 by the World Film Corporation, starring Fania Marinoff and Holbrook Blinn.
 In 1962 the Frank Norris Cabin was designated a National Historic Landmark.
 An opera by William Bolcom, based loosely on his 1899 novel, McTeague, was premiered by Chicago's Lyric Opera in 1992.  The work is in two acts, with libretto by Arnold Weinstein and Robert Altman.  The Lyric Opera's presentation featured Ben Heppner in the title role and Catherine Malfitano as Trina, the dentist's wife.
 In 2008, the Library of America selected Norris's newspaper article "Hunting Human Game" for inclusion in its two-century retrospective of American True Crime.
 An alley-way in San Francisco is named for him (Frank Norris Place). It runs from Polk St. to Larkin St. and is located parallel to and in between Pine St. and Bush St. in the city's Lower Nob Hill district.
 A tavern on San Francisco's Polk Street, near Frank Norris Place, is named McTeague's Saloon in honor of Norris's novel McTeague (1899). The interior and exterior are decorated with objects and imagery associated with the novel.
 The popular writing quip, "I hate writing, but love having written" is credited to a letter of writing advice written by Norris, published posthumously in 1915.

Works
Fiction
 (1892). Yvernelle. Philadelphia: J.B. Lippincott Company.
 (1898). Moran of the "Lady Letty": A Story of Adventure Off the California Coast. New York: Doubleday & McClure Co.
 (1899). McTeague: A Story of San Francisco. New York: Doubleday & McClure Co.
 (1899). Blix. New York: Doubleday & McClure Co.
 (1900). A Man's Woman. New York: Doubleday & McClure Co.
 (1901). The Octopus: A Story of California. New York: Doubleday, Page & Co.
 (1903). The Pit: A Story of Chicago. New York: Doubleday, Page & Co.
 (1903). A Deal in Wheat and Other Stories of the New and Old West. New York: Doubleday, Page & Company.
 (1906). The Joyous Miracle. New York: Doubleday, Page & Company.
 (1909). The Third Circle. New York: John Lane Company.
 (1914). Vandover and the Brute. New York: Doubleday, Page & Company.
 (1931). Frank Norris of "The Wave." Stories & Sketches From the San Francisco Weekly, 1893 to 1897. San Francisco: The Westgate Press.
 (1998). The Best Short Stories of Frank Norris. New York: Ironweed Press Inc.

Short Stories
 (1907). "A Lost Story." In: The Spinners' Book of Fiction. San Francisco and New York: Paul Elder and Company.
 (1909). "The Passing of Cock-Eye Blacklock." In: California Story Book. San Francisco: Pub. by the English Club of the University of California.
 (1910). "San Francisco's Old Chinatown." In: Pathway to Western Literature. Stockton, Cal.: Nettie E. Gaines.

Non-fiction
 (1898). The Surrender of Santiago. Unknown
 (1903). The Responsibilities of the Novelist. New York: Doubleday, Page & Company.
 (1986). Frank Norris: Collected Letters. San Francisco: The Book Club of California.
 (1996). The Apprenticeship Writings of Frank Norris 1896–1898. Philadelphia: American Philosophical Society.

Selected articles
 "The True Reward of the Novelist," The World's Work, Vol. II, May/October 1901.
 "Mr. Kipling's Kim," The World's Work, Vol. II, May/October 1901 (unsigned) 
 "The Need of a Literary Conscience," The World's Work, Vol. III, November 1901/April 1902.
 "The Frontier Gone at Last," The World's Work, Vol. III, November 1901/April 1902.
 "The Novel with a 'Purpose'," The World's Work, Vol. IV, May/October 1902.
 "A Neglected Epic," The World's Work, Vol. V, November 1902/April 1903.

Translations
 "Fifi," by Léon Faran, The Wave, Vol. XVI, No. 4, January 23, 1897.
 "Not Guilty," by Marcel l'Heureux, The Wave, Vol. XVI, No. 25, June 19, 1897.
 "Story of a Wall," by Pierre Loti, The Wave, Vol. XVI, No. 35, August 28, 1897.
 "An Elopement," by Ferdinand Bloch, The Wave, Vol. XVI, No. 52, December 25, 1897.

Collected works
 The Complete Works of Frank Norris. New York: P.F. Collier Sons Publishers, 1898–1903 (4 Vols.)
 Complete Works of Frank Norris. New York: Doubleday, Page & Company, 1903 (7 Vols.)
 The Collected Works of Frank Norris. New York: Doubleday, Doran & Company, Inc., 1928 (10 Vols.)
 Norris: Novels and Essays. New York: Library of America, 1986.
A Novelist in the Making: A Collection of Student Themes, and the Novels Blix and Vandover and the Brute. Harvard University Press, 1970

References

Further reading

 Åhnebrink, Lars (1961). The Beginnings of Naturalism in American Fiction: A Study of the Works of Hamlin Garland, Stephen Crane, and Frank Norris. New York: Russell & Russell.
 Anderson, Grace E. (1933). A Dictionary of Characters in the Novels of Frank Norris. University of Kansas.
 Armes, William Dallam (1902). "Concerning the Work of the Late Frank Norris," Sunset, Vol. X, pp. 165–167.
 Bechter, Leslie G. (1939). Frank Norris: his Place in the Development of the American Novel. State University of Iowa.
 Bixler, Paul H. (1934). "Frank Norris's Literary Reputation," American Literature, Vol. 6, No. 2, pp. 109–121.
 Borus, Daniel H. (1989). Writing Realism: Howells, James, and Norris in the Mass Market. University of North Carolina Press. 
 Boyd, Jennifer (1993). Frank Norris: Spatial Form and Narrative Time. New York: Peter Lang Pub. Incorporated.
 Brooks, Van Wyck (1952). "Frank Norris and Jack London." In: The Confident Years: 1885–1915. New York: E.P. Dutton & Co.
 Brown, Deming Bronson (1942). The Development of the Use of Symbolism in the Novels of Frank Norris. (M.A. Thesis), University of Washington.
 Cargill, Oscar (1941). Intellectual America. New York: The Macmillan Company.
 Clarke, Robert Montgomery (1932). Contemporary American Novelists: Frank Norris. (M. A. Thesis), Stanford University.
 Clift, Denison Hailey (1907). "The Artist in Frank Norris," The Pacific Monthly, Vol. XVII, pp. 313–322.
 Cooper, Frederic Taber (1899). "Frank Norris, Realist," The Bookman, Vol. 10, pp. 234–238.
 Cooper, Frederic Taber (1911). "Frank Norris." In: Some American Story Tellers. New York: Henry Holt & Company, pp. 295–330.
 Cowley, Malcolm (1947). "'Not Men': A Natural History of American Naturalism," Kenyon Review, Vol. IX, pp. 414–435.
 Crane, Warren Eugene (1939). The Life and Works of Frank Norris as a Reflection of Historical and Literary Trends between 1890 and 1902. (M.A. Thesis), University of Washington.
 Davison, Richard Allan (1981). "Frank Norris and the Arts of Social Criticism," American Literary Realism, 1870–1910, Vol. 14, No. 1, pp. 77–89.
 Dillingham, William B. (1969). Frank Norris: Instinct and Art. Lincoln: University of Nebraska Press. 
 Dobie, Charles Caldwell (1928). "Frank Norris, or, up from Culture," The American Mercury, Vol. 13, pp. 412–424.
 East, Harry M. Jr. (1912). "A Lesson from Frank Norris," Overland monthly, Vol. 60, pp. 633–634.
 Frohock, Wilbur Merrill (1968). Frank Norris. Minneapolis: University of Minnesota Press.
 Garland, Hamlin (1903). "The Work of Frank Norris," The Critic, Vol. XLII, pp. 216–218.
 Ghodes, Clarence Louis Frank (1951). "The Facts of Life versus Pleasant Reading." In: The Literature of the American People. New York: Appleton-Century-Crofts, pp. 737–762.
 Goodrich, Arthur (1902). "Frank Norris," Current Literature, Vol. XXXIII, p. 764.
 Goodrich, Arthur (1903). "Norris, the Man," Current Literature, Vol. XXXIV, p. 105.
 Goldsmith, Arnold Smith (1953). Free Will, Determinism and Social Responsibility in the Writings of Oliver Wendell Holmes Sr. Frank Norris and Henry James. (Ph.D. Dissertation), University of Wisconsin.
 Goldsmith, Arnold Smith (1958). "The Development of Frank Norris's Philosophy." In: Studies in Honor of John Wilcox. Detroit: Wayne State University Press.
 Graham, Don (1978). The Fiction of Frank Norris: The Aesthetic Context. Columbia: University of Missouri Press. 
 Grattan, C. Hartley (1929). "Frank Norris," The Bookman, Vol. 69, pp. 506–510.
 Harrison, Robert (1941). The Writings of Frank Norris as Viewed by his Contemporaries. (M.A. Thesis), Ohio University.
 Hart, James D. (1970). A Novelist in the Making: Frank Norris. Harvard University Press. 
 Hill, Marion V. (1954). A Study of Thematic Forces in the Novels of Frank Norris. (M.A. Thesis), Bownling Green State University.
 Hill, John Stanley (1960). Frank Norris's Heroines. University of Wisconsin. 
 Hochman, Barbara (1988). The Art of Frank Norris, Storyteller. University of Missouri Press 
 Howells, William Dean (1965). "Frank Norris (1870–1902)." In: Criticism and Fiction. New York University Press, pp. 276–282.
 Hussman, Lawrence E. (1998). Harbingers of a Century: The Novels of Frank Norris. New York: Peter Lang Pub Inc.
 Johnson, George W. (1961). "Frank Norris and Romance," American Literature, Vol. 33, No. 1, pp. 52–63.
 Kaplan, Charles (1952). Frank Norris and the Craft of Fiction. (Ph.D. Dissertation), Northwestern University.
 Kusler, Gerald E. (1950). The Evolution of Frank Norris. (M.A. Thesis), State University of Iowa.
 Kwiat, Joseph J. (1953). "The Newspaper Experience: Crane, Norris and Dreiser," Nineteenth Century Fiction, Vol. VIII, pp. 99–117.
 Letizia, Louise M. (1950). Frank Norris: A Study in Contrasts and Contradictions. (M.A. Thesis), University of Pittsburgh.
 Logue, Charles William (1949). Frank Norris: A Study in Romantic Realism. (M.A. Thesis), St. John University.
 Marchand, Ernest (1942). Frank Norris: A Study. Oxford University Press.
 Matthews, Margaret Moore (1937). Frank Norris: Pioneer Realist. (M.A. Thesis), University of South Carolina.
 McCormick, Paul S. (1931). Frank Norris and the American Epic. (M.A. Thesis), Columbia University.
 McElrath, Joseph R. (1978). "Frank Norris: A Biographical Essay," American Literary Realism, 1870–1910, Vol. 11, No. 2, pp. 219–234.
 McElrath, Joseph R. Jr. (1988). Frank Norris and the Wave: A Bibliography. New York: Garland Pub.
 McElrath, Joseph R. Jr. (1992). Frank Norris: A Descriptive Bibliography. Pittsburgh: University of Pittsburgh Press.
 McElrath, Joseph R. Jr. (1993). "Frank Norris' 'The Puppets and the Puppy': LeContean Idealism or Naturalistic Skepticism?," American Literary Realism, 1870–1910, Vol. 26, No. 1, pp. 50–59.
 McElrath, Joseph R. Jr., and Crisler, Jesse S. (2006). Frank Norris: A Life. University of Illinois Press  (the definitive biography of Norris)
 McElrath, Joseph R. Jr., and Crisler, Jesse S. (2013). Frank Norris Remembered. University of Alabama Press.
 McGinn, Richard Joseph (1954). The Characterization of Women in the Novels of Frank Norris. (M.A Thesis), Columbia University.
 Mitchell, Marvin O'Neill (1953). A Study of Realistic and Romantic Elements in the Fiction of E. W. Howe, Joseph Kirkland, Hamlin Garland and Harold Frederic and Frank Norris, 1882–1902. (Ph.D. Dissertation), University of North Carolina.
 Musich, Gerald Donald (1973). Frank Norris' Character Types. University of Wisconsin–Madison.
 Norris, Charles G. (1914). Frank Norris, 1870–1902. New York: Doubleday, Page & Co.
 Pallette, Drew B. (1934). The Theories and Practice of Frank Norris as Related to his California Background. (M.A. Thesis), University of Southern California.
 Parrington, Vernon Louis (1928). "The Development of Realism." In: The Reinterpretation of American Literature. New York: Harcourt, Brace.
 Patee, Fred Lewis (1937). The New American Literature, 1890–1930. New York: D. Appleton-Century Company.
 Phillips, Marion B. (1922). Aspects of the Naturalistic Novel in America. (M.A. Thesis), University of California.
 Piper, Henry Dan (1956). "Frank Norris and Scott Fitzgerald," Huntington Library Quarterly, Vol. 19, No. 4, pp. 393–400.
 Pizer, Donald (1958). "Romantic Individualism in Garland, Norris and Crane," American Quarterly, Vol. X, No. 4, pp. 463–475.
 Pizer, Donald (1966). The Novels of Frank Norris. Indiana University Press. 
 Preston, Harriet Waters (1903). "The Novels of Mr. Norris," The Atlantic Monthly, Vol. XCI, pp. 691–692.
 Ramsay, Orrington Cozzens (1950). Frank Norris and Environment. (Ph.D. Dissertation), University of Wisconsin.
 Rosa, Matthew Whiting (1929). Frank Norris. (M.A. Thesis), Columbia University.
 Smith, Allan Lloyd (1995). "Frank Norris: The Crisis of Representation," American Literary Realism, 1870–1910, Vol. 27, No. 2, pp. 74–83.
 Spector, Michael Jay (1962). Frank Norris and Human Nature. University of Wisconsin–Madison.
 Stegner, Wallace (1965). The American Novel: from James Fenimore Cooper to William Faulkner. New York: Basic Books.
 Thorp, Willard (1960). American Writing in the Twentieth Century. Harvard University Press.
 Todd, Frank M. (1902). "Frank Norris, Student, Author and Man," University of California Magazine, Vol. VIII, pp. 349–356.
 Toher, Martha Dimes (1982). "'The Music of the Spheres': The Diapason in Frank Norris's Works," American Literary Realism, 1870–1910, Vol. 15, No. 2, pp. 166–181.
 Underwood, John Curtis (1914). "Frank Norris." In: Literature and Insurgency. New York: Mitchell Kennerley, pp. 130–178.
 Walker, Franklin (1932). Frank Norris: A Biography. New York: Doubleday, Doran & Company, Inc.

External links

 
 
 
 
Western American Literature Journal: Frank Norris
 Works by Frank Norris, at Hathi Trust
 Guide to the Frank Norris Collection at The Bancroft Library
 Draft fragment 117 from The Octopus is part of the Ravi D. Goel collection on Frederic Taber Cooper at Yale's Beinecke Library. (The Bancroft Library collection includes draft fragments 7, 190 and 213 from The Octopus.)
 Frank Norris Page at the William Dean Howells Society; includes links to works on the web, bibliography, index to Frank Norris Studies
 
 5 short radio episodes "Bestial Welter", "Nourisher of Nations" and "The Octopus" from The Octopus; "Polk Street" from McTeague and "Two Voices" from The Santa Cruz Venetian Carnival by Frank Norris. California Legacy Project.

1870 births
1902 deaths
American investigative journalists
19th-century American novelists
20th-century American novelists
Writers from San Francisco
Deaths from peritonitis
Burials at Mountain View Cemetery (Oakland, California)
University of California, Berkeley alumni
Writers from California
Writers from Chicago
American male novelists
19th-century American male writers
20th-century American male writers
Novelists from Illinois
20th-century American non-fiction writers
American male non-fiction writers